Mīria George (born 1980) is a New Zealand writer, producer and director of Māori and Cook Island descent. Best known for being the author of award-winning stage plays, George has also written radio, television and poetry, and was one of the film directors of the portmanteau film Vai. In November 2005, she won the Emerging Pacific Artist's Award at the Arts Pasifika Awards. Mīria George was the first Cook Islands artist to receive the Fulbright-Creative New Zealand Pacific Writer's Residency at the University of Hawaii.

Background 
Mīria George was born Rotorua, New Zealand, her schooling took place in New Zealand, the Cook Islands and Costa Rica. Her heritage is Māori from Te Arawa and Ngāti Awa, and Cook Islands from Tumutevarovaro, Enua Manu, Ngāti Kuki ‘Ārani. Her father was Ian George, a well-known Cook Island visual artist. 

She started writing in 2002 and in 2008 studied in a Masters in Creative Writing from Victoria University of Wellington's International Institute of Modern Letters. She lives in Wellington with her partner Hone Kouka who is also a New Zealand playwright and director. In 2001 they co-founded Tawata Productions and Tawata Press, an organisation that supports creative work from Pacific and Māori writers by producing festivals, workshops and tours of performances.

Career 
The work of Mīria George has toured New Zealand and internationally, including Canada, Hawai'i, Australia and the United Kingdom. In November 2005, she won the Emerging Pacific Artist's Award at the Arts Pasifika Awards, organised by Creative New Zealand, and two Chapman Tripp Theatre Awards for her first play, Ohe Ake. She is one of the people featured in the book Cook Island Heroes to inspire young Cook Islanders.

The political interrogation of the erosion of Māori rights, dignity, and humanity in a Pākehā-dominated New Zealand was forefront of George's best known plays called and what remains. It divided critics and audiences and created a lot of debate. It is regularly taught in schools, and is part of a movement in Māori theatre wider than marae-based traditional stories. 

Her radio work includes writing episodes in Skinwriting for Radio New Zealand National. 

In 2016 George received a three-month Fulbright-Creative New Zealand Pacific Writer's Residency at the University of Hawaii. Her focus was to develop a new work called Fire In The Water, Fire In The Sky addressing effects of colonisation, Christianity and climate change in the Pacific.

In a review of her play Sunset Road, Ewen Coleman observed that it "weaves both reality and symbolism through the stories" but that it "initially comes across as languid and slow with little clarity in what is going on not helped by the unnatural delivery of the stilted dialogue".

As co-director of Tawata Productions, George has been part of producing many events in the landscape of New Zealand theatre. This includes the annual Kia Mau Festival founded in 2012 and the Matariki Development Festival, an international indigenous playwrights' festival. In 2017 as part of the Kia Mau Festival, 160 indigenous artists and practitioners took part. George won the Bruce Mason Playwriting Award in 2017.

In the book Floating Islanders: Pasifika Theatre in Aotearoa it states, "George has played a prominent role in bringing the politics of Māori and Pasifika issues to the stage."

Bibliography

Plays 

Ohe Ake, The Awakening (play) (2004)
And What Remains (play) (2006)
He Reo Aroha (play), co-written with Jamie McCaskill (2010)
Sunset Road (play) (2012)
The Vultures (play) (2016)
Urban Hymns (play)

Poetry 

 The Wet Season (poetry), Wai-te-ata Press

Film 

 Vai (2019) director, writer. Vai is portmanteau feature film made by nine female Pacific filmmakers, filmed in seven different Pacific countries: Fiji, Tonga, Solomon Islands, Kuki Airani (Cook Islands), Samoa, Niue and Aotearoa (New Zealand).

References

Living people
New Zealand women dramatists and playwrights
International Institute of Modern Letters alumni
1980 births
21st-century New Zealand dramatists and playwrights
21st-century New Zealand women writers